Jean Patrick Hennessy (26 April 1874 – 4 November 1944) was a French politician.

Hennessy was born at Cherves-Richemont in the Charente département, son of Maurice Hennessy and his wife Jeanne, née Foussat. His family, of Irish origin, were the proprietors of the Hennessy cognac business, now part of LVMH.  

Hennessy was elected to the French Chamber of Deputies in the French elections on 1924 for the Cartel des Gauches. In doing so, he continued the tradition begun by his great-grandfather Jacques Hennessy, an Orléanist deputy from 1824 to 1842, and his grand-uncle  Auguste Hennessy, senator from 1876 to 1879. Hennessy was re-elected in the election of 1928 and served as agriculture minister from 1928 to 1930, and then as French ambassador to Switzerland.

His elder brother James had been elected before him to Parliament as député and senator, but he chose to dedicate himself to the management of the family business. 

In the 1932 general election Hennessy was defeated by Henri Malet of the Democratic Republican Alliance. Out of parliament, he founded the Social-National Party and was elected again as deputy for Alpes-Maritimes, sitting with the Independent Left group in the Chamber of Deputies.

On 10 July 1940, at the joint session of the French parliament which granted extraordinary powers to Marshal Philippe Pétain, Jean Hennessy and his brother James were part of the 80 parliamentarians who opposed the measure. 
He had been married to Marguerite de Mun, who bore him two sons, Patrick and Kilian, and a daughter Jacqueline. Kilian Hennessy (1907-2010) later became chairman of the Cognac business and contributed to its merger into the LVMH group. 

Jean Hennessy died at Lausanne in Switzerland in 1944 where he had lived since 1941.

References 
François Dubasque, Jean Hennessy (1874-1944). Argent et réseaux au service d'une nouvelle République, Presses Universitaires de Rennes, 2008.
 Jean Hennessy dictionnaire des parlementaires français de 1889 à 1940 (J.Joly)

1874 births
1944 deaths
People from Charente
French people of Irish descent
Politicians from Nouvelle-Aquitaine
Republican-Socialist Party politicians
Social-National Party (France) politicians
French Ministers of Agriculture
Members of the 10th Chamber of Deputies of the French Third Republic
Members of the 11th Chamber of Deputies of the French Third Republic
Members of the 12th Chamber of Deputies of the French Third Republic
Members of the 13th Chamber of Deputies of the French Third Republic
Members of the 14th Chamber of Deputies of the French Third Republic
Members of the 16th Chamber of Deputies of the French Third Republic
The Vichy 80
Lycée Janson-de-Sailly alumni
Recipients of the Military Cross
Hennessy family